The Coleman-Desha Plantation, in Harrison County, Kentucky near Cynthiana was listed on the National Register of Historic Places in 1993.

The main house, built in c.1812, is Georgian in style.  It has five-bay front and rear facades built of Flemish bond brick. The listing included four contributing buildings and two contributing structures: the main house and kitchen, a smokehouse, a springhouse, a double log crib barn (sheep barn), and a single log crib barn.

References

Plantations in Kentucky
National Register of Historic Places in Harrison County, Kentucky
Georgian architecture in Kentucky
Buildings and structures completed in 1812
1812 establishments in Kentucky
Agricultural buildings and structures on the National Register of Historic Places in Kentucky